Samuel C. Morrison Jr. (born April 19, 1982) is a Liberian-born screenwriter, director, producer and journalist. His professional writing career began as a contributing writer for The Source Magazine, before making the transition into the film and television industry.

Career
Morrison started in the entertainment industry by interning in the promotions department at Def Jam Recordings and working in the A&R department for TVT Records before moving to writing and story-telling. After being hired to ghost write a couple of screenplays, he formed Deck of Cards Entertainment Media.

In January 2012, Morrison was featured on Hot 97's Street Soldiers along with Tuskegee Airmen Dr. Roscoe Brown Jr., actor Terrence Howard, Red Tails director Anthony Hemingway and actor-producer Casper Martinez. The interview was conducted by radio host and journalist Lisa Evers and dealt with the lack of minority influence in Hollywood.

In addition to writing two episodes for TV One's Love That Girl! starring Tatyana Ali, Morrison served as a writer and producer for HuffPost's BV365, an entertainment news show that focused on black entertainment. Morrison also returned to The Source Magazine in January 2014.

Morrison produced the independent psychological thriller, By Deception, based on a screenplay he wrote. By Deception premiered November 2022 on the Peacock streaming network.

Personal life

Activism
In 2014, after Jersey City Officer Melvin Santiago was murdered in the line of duty, Samuel penned an open letter to Jersey City residents, in which he pleaded for unity and prosperity.

Filmography

References

External links
 
The Source - Sam Morrison's Author Archive
 Celebrities Photos & Facts
 Samuel Morrison Minorities in Hollywood Interview with Hot 97 Street Soldiers

1982 births
People from Monrovia
Writers from Jersey City, New Jersey
Living people
Liberian journalists